City of Industry is one of two gassers sharing the name.

The first car named City of Industry was a Cadillac-powered 1953 Kurtis.  It  won the NHRA national titles in A/SP (A Production) at Oklahoma City, Oklahoma in 1958 (with a pass of 12.17 seconds at ), AM/SP (A Modified Production) at Detroit Dragway  in 1960   (with a pass of 12.29  seconds at ), and at Indianapolis Raceway Park in 1961 (with a pass of 11.91 seconds at ) and 1962 (with a pass of 12.53 seconds at ).

The second was a Cadillac-powered 1963 Kurtis.  It won the national AAM/SP (A Modified Production supercharged) title at Indianapolis Raceway Park in 1964 with a 10.62/ pass.

Both were driven by Sam Parriott throughout their racing careers.

Notes

Sources
Davis, Larry. Gasser Wars, North Branch, MN:  Cartech, 2003, pp. 180–8.

See also
 Cadillac High Technology engine

1950s cars
1960s cars
Drag racing cars
Rear-wheel-drive vehicles